William James "Rocky" Moran Jr. (born January 11, 1980) is an American racing driver from Irvine, California. He is the son of retired racer Rocky Moran.

Racing career

Early career
Moran participated in karting from 1990 to 1994. In 1994 he transitioned to cars through the Skip Barber Racing School. He made his professional racing debut in 1996 in the Barber Dodge Pro Series, finishing 10th. He improved to sixth in 1997 but fell back to 11th in 1998. He made his Toyota Atlantic debut in 1998. Moran split his time between Barber Dodge and Toyota Atlantic in 1999. In 2000 he joined Toyota Atlantic full-time and finished fifth in points for P-1 Racing. In 2001 he began the season with Condor Motorsports but switched to Cobb Racing mid-way through the season. He captured his first series victory in the season finale at Laguna Seca and finished eighth in points. In 2002 he returned to the series driving for Sigma Autosport. He finished fifth in points with a win at Circuit Gilles Villeneuve and two other podium finishes. Moran spent 2003 away from professional motorsports, but returned to Atlantics in 2004, making five starts with Polestar Motor Racing. He made three Busch North Series race starts in 2005 as well as two Atlantics starts and drove in the Infiniti Pro Series' Freedom 100 but suffered a gearbox failure after only four laps.

Sports cars
In 2006 Moran made three starts in the Rolex Sports Car Series. He also made occasional road course appearances in the Busch North Series from 2006 to 2009.

In 2011 Moran was a Jaguar factory driver in the American Le Mans Series with RSR Racing, driving in five of the nine rounds of the championship. However the car was plagued by mechanical problems and never finished higher than 20th.

IndyCar Series
Moran completed his first IndyCar Series test with Schmidt Peterson Motorsports in fall of 2014 at Homestead Miami Speedway.

Shortly before the 2015 Grand Prix of Long Beach it was announced that Moran would drive in the race with Dale Coyne Racing, stepping into the seat formerly held by Carlos Huertas. His IndyCar debut came nearly 10 years after his last Atlantics start. However, he broke his thumb during contact with the wall during Friday practice and was replaced for the rest of the race weekend by Conor Daly.

Racing record

American open-wheel racing results
(key)

Atlantic Championship

 1 C2 Class

Indy Lights

IndyCar Series

 * Season still in progress

References

External links

1980 births
Living people
Racing drivers from California
Atlantic Championship drivers
Indy Lights drivers
Rolex Sports Car Series drivers
American Le Mans Series drivers
Barber Pro Series drivers
Dale Coyne Racing drivers
AFS Racing drivers